The 2009 Coca-Cola GM was the 39th edition of the Greenlandic Men's Football Championship. The final round was held in Qeqertarsuaq from August 10 to 15. It was won by G-44 Qeqertarsuaq for the first time in its history.

Qualifying stage

North Greenland

Disko Bay
Nagdlunguaq-48 and Kangaatsiaq BK 84 qualified for the final Round.

NB G-44 Qeqertarsuaq qualified for the final Round as hosts.

Central Greenland

NB Some match results are unavailable.

East Greenland
A.T.A.-60 qualified for the final Round.

South Greenland

Final round

Pool 1

NB Teams tied on points were separated by head-to-head record.

Pool 2

NB Teams tied on points were separated by head-to-head record.

Playoffs

Semi-finals

Seventh-place match

Fifth-place match

Third-place match

Final

See also
Football in Greenland
Football Association of Greenland
Greenland national football team
Greenlandic Men's Football Championship

References

Greenlandic Men's Football Championship seasons
Green
Green
football